Chile Con Soul, recorded in 1965 and released on the Pacific Jazz label, is the ninth album by The Jazz Crusaders.

Reception

AllMusic rated the album with 4 stars; in their review, Lindsay Planer said: "Chile con Soul (1965) is one of the best examples of The Jazz Crusaders at one of the many musical pinnacles in their 30-plus year existence".

Track listing 
 "Agua Dulce (Sweetwater)" (Joe Sample) - 5:25
 "Soul Bourgeoisie" (Hubert Laws) - 7:44
 "Ontem a Note" (Clare Fischer) - 4:19
 "Tough Talk" (Wayne Henderson, Stix Hooper) - 2:38
 "Tacos" (Laws) - 4:08
 "Latin Bit" (Kenny Cox) - 4:08
 "The Breeze and I" (Ernesto Lecuona, Al Stillman) - 5:08
 "Dulzura" (Fischer) - 4:37

Personnel 
Wayne Henderson - trombone
Wilton Felder - tenor saxophone
Hubert Laws - flute
Joe Sample - piano
Clare Fischer - organ
Al McKibbon - bass
Stix Hooper - drums
Carlos Vidal - congas
Hungaria Garcia - timbales, cowbells

References 

The Jazz Crusaders albums
1965 albums
Pacific Jazz Records albums